"Full Moon Full of Love" is a single by Canadian country music artist k.d. lang. Released in 1989, it was the first single from lang's album Absolute Torch and Twang. The song reached #1 on the RPM Country Tracks chart in September 1989 and #22 on the Billboard Hot Country Singles chart.

Chart performance

Year-end charts

References

1989 singles
K.d. lang songs
RPM Country Tracks number-one singles of the year
1989 songs
Sire Records singles